Teenage Mutant Ninja Turtles, released in Japan as  and in Europe as Teenage Mutant Hero Turtles, is a 1989 beat 'em up arcade game released by Konami. It is based on the Teenage Mutant Ninja Turtles franchise, including the first animated series that began airing two years earlier. In the game, up to four players control the titular Ninja Turtles, fighting through various levels to defeat the turtles' enemies, including the Shredder, Krang and the Foot Clan. Released during a high point in popularity for the Teenage Mutant Ninja Turtles franchise, the arcade game was a worldwide hit, becoming the highest-grossing dedicated arcade game of 1990 in the United States and Konami's highest-grossing arcade game. Versions for various home systems soon followed, including the Nintendo Entertainment System. A sequel, Teenage Mutant Ninja Turtles: Turtles in Time, was released in 1991.

Gameplay
The player chooses from one of the four Ninja Turtles: Leonardo, Michelangelo, Donatello, and Raphael. Depending on the version of the game, the characters are either chosen via an in-game select screen or based on which coin slot the player placed their credit into. After Shredder kidnaps the Turtles' friend April O'Neil and their mentor Splinter, they must give chase, save their comrades, and defeat the evil Shredder. Up to four players (two in some versions) can take control of any of the Turtles. Donatello has slower attacks but a longer range, Michelangelo and Raphael have faster attacks but a shorter range, and Leonardo is a well-rounded Turtle with average range and speed.

The eight-way joystick controls the movements of the Turtle, the jump button makes them jump and the attack button makes them hit in front of them using their weapon. The Turtles can also perform special moves, including throwing Foot soldiers overhead and performing a special attack by pressing the jump and attack buttons; Raphael rolls along the ground and finishes with a kick, while the other Turtles do a sweeping jump attack with their weapons. The Turtles can also spring off the wall in certain areas. Enemies can be defeated more quickly by slamming them into walls or solid objects. Many objects such as traffic cones, parking meters, fire hydrants and exploding oil drums can be hit or damaged with attacks in order to help defeat nearby enemies. In the attract mode, the game shows the first part of the cartoon opening, along with a portion of the Teenage Mutant Ninja Turtles theme song.

Most of the enemies the Turtles face are the Foot Soldiers, all color-coded to indicate their attack patterns and weapon of choices. Some enemies, such as the standard purple-clad Foot Soldiers and Roadkill Rodney robots, have the ability to restrain the Turtles' mobility and drain their health, leaving only the player open to attack for other enemies. The bosses in the game include Rocksteady and Bebop (individually at first in that order, and later the two of them together), Baxter Stockman (in his human form), Granitor, General Traag, Krang, and Shredder himself.

Development and release

Konami acquired the license for the Teenage Mutant Ninja Turtles franchise around the same time the animated series began airing in 1987. Konami began development on both an arcade game and console game shortly after.

The arcade game was distributed as TMNT: Super Kame Ninja in Japan, Teenage Mutant Ninja Turtles in North America and Oceania, and Teenage Mutant Hero Turtles in Europe. The game was released primarily as a dedicated four-player arcade cabinet in all regions except Japan, where it was sold as a 2-player conversion kit. 2-player conversion kits of the game were released in other regions, serving as less expensive alternatives to 4-player cabinets.

Home versions

Ports to home systems

The game was ported to the Nintendo Entertainment System in 1990. This conversion was titled Teenage Mutant Ninja Turtles II: The Arcade Game in order to avoid confusion with the previous NES game based on the franchise. The Japanese Famicom version was titled Teenage Mutant Ninja Turtles, without a number nor a subtitle, due to the fact that first NES game was localized in Japan under a different title.

This version includes two new levels (the first part of Scene 3 and all of Scene 6), which feature new enemy characters, including two new bosses created specifically for the NES port: Tora (a Polar Bear-like "blizzard beast") and Shogun (a robotic samurai). Most of the original stages from the arcade version were extended as well, and the second half of Scene 3, the parking garage stage, replaces the arcade version's end battle with both Bebop and Rocksteady with a battle against the mutated fly form of Baxter Stockman. The NES port appeared in Nintendo's PlayChoice-10 arcade system.

The NES version featured notable product placement advertising: Pizza Hut logos. The rear cover of the instruction manual provided a coupon for the restaurant, with an expiration date of December 31, 1991.

Computer ports of the arcade game were released by Image Works and ported by Probe Software in 1991 for the ZX Spectrum, Amiga, Amstrad CPC, Atari ST, DOS PC and Commodore 64. The title was changed to Teenage Mutant Hero Turtles: The Coin Op in the European versions, reflecting censorship of the 1987 TV series in certain regions at the time.

Emulated releases
An emulated version of the arcade game is included as a hidden bonus game in Teenage Mutant Ninja Turtles 2: Battle Nexus for the PlayStation 2, Xbox, and GameCube, but with altered music and most of the voice clips edited out. The game is unlocked by finding an antique in Stage 9-1; the antique turns out to be the original arcade machine.

An Xbox Live Arcade version of the game was released under the name TMNT 1989 Classic Arcade on March 14, 2007, published by Ubisoft and ported by Digital Eclipse. The game was priced at 400 Microsoft Points. Like other classic arcade games on the Xbox 360 platform, portions of the original arcade game were emulated with network code and other new features added.  Players could earn achievements as well as play 2-4 player co-op (both online and offline). Unlike the  unlockable in Battle Nexus, this rerelease retains the music and voices of the 1989 arcade game.

In 2019, the game was re-released as a replica arcade cabinet for home use by manufacturer Arcade1Up. The reissue is nearly identical to the original, but there are a few changes: the opening theme is a new recording by a different singer, players do not need to insert quarters to play, and Konami's name on the arcade marquee is replaced by Nickelodeon's.

The arcade and NES versions of the game were re-released as part of Teenage Mutant Ninja Turtles: The Cowabunga Collection in 2022.

Reception

Commercial
The arcade game was a blockbuster hit, especially in North America, becoming Konami's highest-grossing arcade game. Konami was unable to keep up with high demand, so they outsourced additional US manufacturing production to Dynamo Corp. The release of the Teenage Mutant Ninja Turtles film in March 1990 gave the arcade game a further boost in earnings. By early April 1990, Konami had sold over 20,000 arcade cabinets internationally outside of Japan, including over 14,000 cabinets sold in the United States, where it became the biggest arcade hit since Double Dragon (1987). By early May 1990, the game had sold 25,000 arcade cabinets in America and Europe, with more units still in production to meet continued demand at the time.

In North America, Teenage Mutant Ninja Turtles was the highest-grossing upright cabinet on the RePlay arcade charts throughout 1990, from January through spring, summer and autumn to December. During November and December, weekly coin drop earnings averaged $163 per cabinet. It ended the year as the highest-grossing dedicated arcade game of 1990 in the United States, and it won a Diamond award from the American Amusement Machine Association (AAMA) for sales achievement in 1990.

The game was also a major hit in Europe, particularly the United Kingdom, where it was one of the top four highest-grossing arcade games during early 1990 (along with Tecmo World Cup '90, Super Masters and Line of Fire). On Hong Kong's Bondeal charts, Teenage Mutant Ninja Turtles was the top-grossing dedicated arcade game from December 1989 to January 1990. In Australia, the game was a record-breaking arcade hit in 1990 with high earnings during its first six months on the market, which was unusual for licensed arcade games which typically disappeared after several months. In Japan, Game Machine listed Teenage Mutant Ninja Turtles on their September 1, 1990 issue as being the fourth most-popular arcade game for the previous two weeks.

The Xbox Live Arcade digital version of Teenage Mutant Ninja Turtles sold 984,271 units on the Xbox 360 console, .

Critical

Zzap! reported on the arcade game after it appeared at the Amusement Trades Exhibition International (ATEI), calling it a "great coin-op which is best in four player mode."

Japanese gaming magazine Famitsu gave the Famicom (NES) version of the game a 26 out of 40 score.

British gaming magazine The One reviewed the home computer versions (Amiga, Atari ST, DOS) of Teenage Mutant Ninja Turtles under the British title, Teenage Mutant Hero Turtles, giving credit for the game's graphics and sound, but criticizing the enemy AI and the ports' scrolling, concluding that the game "lacks depth and imagination".

Time's Jared Newman named to his list of "14 Important Arcade Games Not Available for iPhone or iPad", citing the game's pioneering 4-player simultaneous play.

GamesRadar ranked it the 25th best NES game made. The staff attributed the Ninja Turtles' continued success to the game and praised its visuals, audio, and combat system.

Notes

References

External links

1989 video games
Amiga games
Amstrad CPC games
Arcade video games
Atari ST games
Commodore 64 games
Cooperative video games
DOS games
Konami beat 'em ups
Nintendo Entertainment System games
PlayChoice-10 games
Video game sequels
Video games based on Teenage Mutant Ninja Turtles
Video games developed in Japan
Video games scored by Kozo Nakamura
Video games scored by Miki Higashino
Video games set in New York City
Xbox 360 Live Arcade games
ZX Spectrum games
Side-scrolling beat 'em ups
Multiplayer and single-player video games
Image Works games